Ivan Ivanovich Indinok (Russian: Иван Иванович Индинок; born on 6 August 1938), is a Russian politician who served as the 2nd Head of Administration of Novosibirsk Oblast from 1993 to 1995. He also served as the Head of Novosibirsk from 1991 to 1993.

Biography

Ivan Indinok was born in Kozlovka, in Krasnoyarsk Krai on 6 August 1938.

He graduated from Tomsk Polytechnic Institute in 1962.

He held various engineering positions at the enterprises of the military-industrial complex in Novosibirsk since 1962. From 1972 to 1981, he was a senior engineer, the head of the laboratory, and secretary of the party committee of NPO Vostok.

Political activity

From 1981 to 1988, he was the second, then the first secretary of the Zayeltsovsky district committee of the CPSU, the second secretary of the Novosibirsk city party committee. In 1988 he was elected chairman of the executive committee of the Novosibirsk City Council. In April 1990, Indinok was replaced by Oleg Semchenko. From 1988 to 1990, he headed the Association of Siberian and Far Eastern Cities. On 26 December 1991, Indinok was appointed 1st head of the administration of Novosibirsk

On 5 October 1993, after the violent dispersal of the Congress of People's Deputies and the Supreme Soviet of Russia, Indinok was appointed 2nd Head of Administration of Novosibirsk Oblast, replacing Vitaly Mukha, who was removed for support of the Supreme Soviet.

In December 1993, he was elected to the Federation Council of the first convocation, and was a member of the Committee on Federation Affairs, and the Federal Treaty and Regional Policy.

In the first election of the governor of the Novosibirsk Oblast in December 1995, Indinok took first place in the first round (22.81% of the vote), in the second round he lost to his predecessor Mukha.

Since 1997, Indinok was a member of the Political Council of the Our Home – Russia party, and in the same year, he initiated the creation of an interregional public organization "Siberian Party" and was the chairman of its Supreme Council until March 1998.

Currently, he is the president of the "Light a Candle" humanitarian and educational club (Novosibirsk), the chairman of the public council of the Main Directorate of the Ministry of Internal Affairs of Russia for the Siberian Federal District. Indinok is the Honorary resident of Novosibirsk.

References

1938 births
Living people
People from Krasnoyarsk Krai
Governors of Novosibirsk Oblast
Mayors of Novosibirsk
Members of the Federation Council of Russia (1994–1996)
Our Home – Russia politicians
Tomsk Polytechnic University alumni
Recipients of the Order of the Red Banner of Labour